Dawn Penn (born 11 January 1952) is a Jamaican reggae singer. She first had a short career during the rocksteady era, between 1967 and 1969, but is most known for her single "You Don't Love Me (No, No, No)" which became a worldwide hit in 1994.

Career
Penn's earliest recordings were composed and written by her around 1966 using session musicians. In 1967, she recorded the rocksteady single "You Don't Love Me", produced by Coxsone Dodd at Studio One. She also recorded "Why Did You Lie?" at Studio One, "Broke My Heart" for Bunny Lee, "I Let You Go Boy" and covers of "To Sir with Love" and "Here Comes the Sun". Dawn had also recorded for singer and producer Prince Buster early in her career with songs like "Long Day, Short Night", "Blue Yes Blue" and "Here's the Key". By 1970, Penn had left the music industry and had moved to the Virgin Islands. However, she faced racism there, and in 1987, she returned to Jamaica and to music.

In the summer of 1992, she was invited to appear on stage at a Studio One anniversary show, where she performed the song "You Don't Love Me" with Steely & Clevie as backing musicians. The performance was a success, and she returned to the recording studio to re-record the song for the tribute album Steely & Clevie Play Studio One Vintage. It was released as the single "You Don't Love Me (No, No, No)" over a year later, reaching the charts in the U.S. and Europe, plus hitting #1 in her native Jamaica, and making #3 in the UK Singles Chart. Penn's album, No, No, No, was released on Big Beat Records in 1994.

Subsequently, "You Don't Love Me (No, No, No)" has been sampled and covered by the artists Kano, Hexstatic, Jae Millz, 311, Ghostface Killah, Mims, Eve featuring Stephen Marley, and Damian Marley. Their versions were all renamed as "No, No, No", bar Ghostface's, which was named "The Splash", and 311's "Omaha Stylee."

Penn performed at the Drum in Birmingham, England, in April 2006, and, in the same year, was on the bill at the Uppsala Reggae Festival in Sweden. In 2011, Penn released a music video for the song "City Life", directed by Antoine Dixon-Bellot. On 30 June 2013, Penn performed "You Don't Love Me (No, No, No)" at the BET Awards. In 2014, The Lee Thompson Ska Orchestra released the single "Bangarang" featuring Penn on lead vocals, and she appeared in the official video to accompany the single. Penn joined the Ska Orchestra on stage to perform the track, on Halloween night 2013, at The Jazz Café in London's Camden Town. Penn also appeared with Thompson and backing singer Darren Fordham on Jools Holland's 2013/14 Hootenanny and again at the Glastonbury Festival in 2014.

Discography

Albums

Extended plays
 EP (2011)

Singles

See also
List of Jamaicans
List of reggae musicians
List of stage names
List of performances on Top of the Pops

References

External links
 
 Dawn Penn on YouTube
 Dawn Penn on Twitter
Discography at Discogs

1952 births
Living people
Musicians from Kingston, Jamaica
20th-century Jamaican women singers
Jamaican reggae singers
Big Beat Records (American record label) artists